Hearts and Spangles is a 1926 American silent drama film directed by Frank O'Connor and starring Wanda Hawley, Robert Gordon and Frankie Darro. A medical student is expelled from college and disowned by his father, and goes to join the circus.

Cast
 Wanda Hawley as Peg Palmer 
 Robert Gordon as Steve Carris 
 Barbara Tennant as Grace Carris 
 Eric Mayne as Dr. Carris 
 Frankie Darro as Bobby 
 Larry Steers as Peter Carris 
 J.P. Lockney as Harry Riley 
 George Chesebro as Barclay 
 Charles Force as Hawkins

References

Bibliography
 Munden, Kenneth White. The American Film Institute Catalog of Motion Pictures Produced in the United States, Part 1. University of California Press, 1997.

External links

1926 films
1926 drama films
Silent American drama films
Films directed by Frank O'Connor
American silent feature films
1920s English-language films
Circus films
American black-and-white films
Gotham Pictures films
1920s American films